European Child & Adolescent Psychiatry is a monthly peer-reviewed medical journal covering child and adolescent psychiatry. It was established in 1992 and is published by Springer Science+Business Media on behalf of the European Society for Child and Adolescent Psychiatry, of which it is the official journal. The editor-in-chief is Johannes Hebebrand (University of Duisburg-Essen). According to the Journal Citation Reports, the journal has a 2020 impact factor of 4.785.

References

External links

Springer Science+Business Media academic journals
Child and adolescent psychiatry journals
Publications established in 1992
Monthly journals
English-language journals
Academic journals associated with international learned and professional societies of Europe